Acid Black Cherry (abbreviated as ABC) is the solo project of the former lead vocalist of Janne Da Arc, Yasu. The group was formed after Janne Da Arc announced their indefinite hiatus.

Information
Acid Black Cherry is the solo project of Yasunori Hayashi, best known by his stage name "yasu", the former vocalist of Janne Da Arc, formed after Janne Da Arc's hiatus announcement.

After performing several lives throughout fifteen locations nationwide beginning in May 2007, Acid Black Cherry debuted on July 18, 2007 with their single Spell Magic (stylized as SPELL MAGIC). Since their debut, the group has released nineteen singles, five studio albums and four cover albums, all of which peaked in the top five on the Oricon charts.

In 2011, ABC held their FREE LIVE 2011 in commemoration of their fourth anniversary in three locations around Osaka, a temporary parking lot at Chubu Centrair International Airport, an outdoor venue at the Maishima Arena and the Fuji-Q Highland Conifer Forest. While planned to only house a total of 40,000 people, the total number of entries exceeded 160,000.

Their third studio album, 2012 (stylized as 『2012』), released on March 21, 2012, became their first album to reach the number-one spot on the Oricon Albums Charts, selling over 200,000 copies. They would again take the number-one position five years later with their fifth studio album Acid BLOOD Cherry, released on June 21, 2017. Their fifteenth single Yes (イエス) had won first in the annual 2012 USEN Yearly Ranking and, as of October 5, 2018, the YouTube play count exceeds 17 million. It was suspected it was this song that helped give Acid Black Cherry more notoriety.

Albums

Studio albums

Cover albums

Singles

DVD/Blu-ray

Other
 jealkb - ROSES (2007.05.16, "D.D.D")
 Karaage!! (2008.02.25, "Fuyu no Maboroshi")
 kiyo - ARTISAN OF PLEASURE (2008.06.25, "Tears")
 20-nen 200 Kyoku (2008.07.23, "Spell magic")
 20 Years 200 Hits Complete Best + a Love Hi-Quality CD Edition Box (2009.03.04, "SPELL MAGIC")
 Hayate - Haya! ~Hayauta NON STOP Mega Mix~ (2009.03.11, "20+∞Century Boys")
 Siam Shade Tribute (2010.10.27, "1/3 no Junjou na Kanjou")
 Siam Shade Tribute vs Original (2011.07.27, "1/3 no Junjou na Kanjou")
 Parade II -Respective Tracks of Buck-Tick- (2012.07.04, "Romanesque")

References

External links
 Official website
 Official Avex page

Avex Group artists
Visual kei musical groups
Japanese alternative rock groups
Japanese progressive rock groups
Japanese pop rock music groups
Musical groups established in 2007